Afrique Football Élite is a football club located in Bamako, Mali. As of the 2020–21 season, the club's team competes in the second tier of Malian football.

In the 2018 Malian Cup, AFE reached the semi-finals of the competition before being eliminated by Djoliba in a 1–0 defeat.

Notable players 

 El Bilal Touré
 Moïse Sahi
Mohamed Soumahoro

References

External links 

 Afrique Football Élite at WorldFootball.net
Football clubs in Mali
Sport in Bamako